"Eutonia" (or Eutony / Eutonie/ Eutoni) is a genus of crane fly in the family Limoniidae.

Species
E. alleni (Johnson, 1909)
E. barbipes (Meigen, 1804)
E. marchandi (Alexander, 1916)
E. phorophragma (Alexander, 1944)
E. satsuma (Westwood, 1876)

References

Limoniidae
Diptera of South America
Diptera of North America
Diptera of Europe
Diptera of Asia
Nematocera genera